Sulcus  (plural: sulci ) is, in astrogeology, an area of complex parallel or subparallel ridges and furrows on a planet or moon.

For example, Uruk Sulcus is a bright region of grooved terrain adjacent to Galileo Regio on Jupiter's moon Ganymede.

References

Planetary geology